Abhinav Kapoor (born 4 July 1984) is an Indian television actor. He has appeared in the notable shows Kasautii Zindagii Kay, Internet Wala Love, Bade Achhe Lagte Hain 2 and Ek Aastha Aisi Bhee.

Life and career

Birth and education (1984–2004)
Abhinav Kapoor was born on 4 July 1984 in Bombay (now known as Mumbai), Maharashtra, India. He obtained his formal education from Mithibai College, Mumbai.

Early career (2004–2010)
In 2004, Kapoor ventured into mainstream television as an actor playing the brief cameo role of Aarav Jain in series Jeet.A breakthrough came for Kapoor in 2005, when Balaji Telefilms gave him a break in their iconic long running daily soap opera Kasautii Zindagii Kay. He portrayed Shravan Gupta Basu, the stepson of the main protagonist Anurag Basu (Cezanne Khan).Later, Kapoor teamed up with Balaji to play uncredited roles, which were factually unknown, between 2006 and 2009 in the successful soap operas Karam Apnaa Apnaa, Kkavyanjali and Kahe Naa Kahe.

Television

References

External links
 
 
 
 

1984 births
Living people
Indian male television actors
Male actors from Mumbai
Participants in Indian reality television series
Actors from Mumbai